The Skeptical Environmentalist: Measuring the Real State of the World is a book by Danish author and statistician Bjørn Lomborg. The book is controversial for outlining Lomborg's views that concerns and responses to environmental issues are overly pessimistic and unsupported. It was first published in Danish in 1998, while the English edition was published as a work in environmental economics by Cambridge University Press in 2001.

In the book, Lomborg sets out what he calls a "litany" of what he considers overly pessimistic claims and policies about environmental issues, and challenges them using cost–benefit analysis. He argues that concerns over pollution, decline in energy resources, deforestation, species loss, water shortages and global warming are overstated, and focus should be diverted to poverty reduction and combatting diseases such as HIV/AIDS.

The book generated great controversy upon its release. The veracity of Lomborg's assertions were criticised by the scientific community and environmental groups in Denmark and internationally, including negative reviews in Nature, Grist and Scientific American, and from the Union of Concerned Scientists. Positive reception in some popular media outlets contrasted sharply with this, and this combined with the ensuing debate aided the book's profile. Lomborg was formally accused of scientific dishonesty and was investigated by the Danish Committees on Scientific Dishonesty, which ruled that the book was scientifically dishonest but that Lomborg was innocent of wrongdoing due to his lack of expertise in relevant fields. The Danish Ministry of Science, Technology and Innovation later criticised this investigation, but the Committee decided not to reinvestigate on the basis that it would come to the same conclusion.

The book established Lomborg's international profile as a prominent critic of the scientific consensus on climate change. He released a follow up, Cool It: The Skeptical Environmentalist's Guide to Global Warming, in 2007.

Background

Bjørn Lomborg is a Danish statistician who worked at Aarhus University in the 1990s.

According to Lomborg, he was inspired by an article in Wired where Julian Lincoln Simon was interviewed, in which Simon claimed that calculations he had conducted with publicly available data led him to conclude that standard doomsday conceptions of the state of the world were incorrect. In 1997, Lomborg decided to undertake a similar assessment with some of his students, and came to similar conclusions as Simon. Based on this, in 1998 four articles were published in Danish newspaper Politiken outlining his views and findings, which attracted controversy in Danish media.

This was later expanded into a book, with the Danish edition Verdens Sande Tilstand (The True State of the World) published on 22 September 1998. A near-direct English translation was published in 2001 as The Skeptical Environmentalist, with the section on global warming expanded and more notes and references than the Danish version. It was published in English by Cambridge University Press.

Contents

The Skeptical Environmentalist'''s subtitle refers to the State of the World report, published annually since 1984 by the Worldwatch Institute. Lomborg designated the report "one of the best-researched and academically most ambitious environmental policy publications," but criticized it for using short-term trends to predict disastrous consequences, in cases where long-term trends would not support the same conclusions.

In establishing its arguments, The Skeptical Environmentalist examined a wide range of issues in the general area of environmental studies, including environmental economics and science, and came to a set of conclusions and recommendations. Lomborg's work directly challenged what it framed as popular examples of green concerns by interpreting data from around 3,000 mostly secondary sources. The author suggested that environmentalists diverted potentially beneficial resources to less deserving environmental issues in ways that were economically damaging. Much of the book's methodology and integrity have been subject to criticism, which argue that Lomborg distorted the fields of research he covers.Skeptical About The Skeptical Environmentalist, Richard M. Fisher's review of The Skeptical Environmentalist, in "The Skeptical Inquirer".

The Litany
"The Litany" comprises areas where, Lomborg claims, overly pessimistic conclusions are made and bad policies are implemented as a result. He cites accepted mainstream sources, like the United States government, United Nations agencies and others.The Skeptical Environmentalist is arranged around four major themes:
 Human prosperity from an economic and demographic point of view
 Human prosperity from an ecological point of view
 Pollution as a threat to human prosperity
 Future threats to human prosperity

Lomborg's main argument is that the vast majority of environmental problems—such as pollution, water shortages, deforestation, and species loss, as well as population growth, hunger, and AIDS—are area-specific and highly correlated with poverty. Therefore, challenges to human prosperity are essentially logistical matters, and can be solved largely through economic and social development. Concerning problems that are more pressing at the global level, such as the depletion of fossil fuels and global warming, Lomborg argues that these issues are often overstated and that recommended policies are often inappropriate if assessed against alternatives.

 1. Human prosperity from an economic and demographic point of view 

Lomborg analyzes three major themes: life expectancy, food and hunger, and prosperity, concluding that life expectancy and health levels have dramatically improved over the past centuries, even though several regions of the world remain threatened, in particular by AIDS. He dismisses Thomas Malthus' theory that increases in the world's population lead to widespread hunger. On the contrary, Lomborg claims that food is widespread, and humanity's daily intake of calories is increasing, and will continue to rise until hunger's eradication, thanks to technological improvements in agriculture. However, Lomborg notes that Africa in particular still produces too little sustenance, an effect he attributes to the continent's economic and political systems. Concerning prosperity, Lomborg argues that wealth, as measured by per capita GDP, should not be the only judging criterion. He points to improvements in education, safety, leisure, and more widespread access to consumer goods as signs that prosperity is increasing in most parts of the world.

2. Human prosperity from an ecological point of view
In this section, Lomborg looks at the world's natural resources and draws a conclusion that contrast starkly to that of the well known report The Limits to Growth. First, he analyzes food once more, this time from an ecological perspective, and again claims that most food products are not threatened by human growth. An exception, however, is fish, which he says continues to be depleted. As a partial solution, Lomborg presents fish farms, which he argues has a less disruptive impact on the world's oceans. Next, Lomborg looks at forests. He finds no indication of widespread deforestation, and states that the Amazon still retains more than 80% of its 1978 tree cover. Lomborg points out that in developing countries, deforestation is linked to poverty and poor economic conditions, so he proposes that economic growth is the best means to tackle the loss of forests.

Concerning energy, Lomborg asserts that oil is not being depleted as fast as is claimed, and that improvements of technology will provide people with fossil fuels for years to come. The author further asserts that many alternatives already exist, and that with time they will replace fossil fuels as an energy source. Concerning other resources, such as metals, Lomborg suggests that based on their price history they are not in short supply. Examining the challenge of collecting sufficient amounts of water, Lomborg says that wars will probably not erupt over water because fighting such wars is not cost-effective (he argues that one week of war with the Palestinians, for instance, would cost Israel more than five desalination plants, according to an Israeli officer). Lomborg emphasizes the need for better water management, as water is distributed unequally around the world.

 3. Pollution as a threat to human prosperity 
Lomborg considers pollution from different angles. He notes that air pollution in wealthy nations has steadily decreased in recent decades. He finds that air pollution levels are highly linked to economic development, with moderately developed countries polluting most. Again, Lomborg argues that faster growth in emerging countries would help them reduce their air pollution levels. Lomborg suggests that devoting resources to reduce the levels of specific air pollutants would provide the greatest health benefits and save the largest number of lives (per amount of money spent), continuing an already decades-long improvement in air quality in most developed countries.  

Concerning water pollution, Lomborg notes again that it is connected with economic progress. He also notes that water pollution in major Western rivers decreased rapidly after the use of sewage systems became widespread. Concerning waste, Lomborg argues that fears are overblown, as the entire waste produced by the United States in the 21st century could fit into a square 100 feet thick and 28 km along each side, or 0.009% of the total surface of the United States.

 4. Future threats to human prosperity 
In this last section, Lomborg puts forward his main assertion: based on a cost-benefit analysis, the environmental threats to human prosperity are overstated and much of policy response is misguided. As an example, Lomborg cites worries about pesticides and their link to cancer. He argues that such concerns are vastly exaggerated in the public perception, as alcohol and coffee are the foods that create by far the greatest risk of cancer, as opposed to vegetables that have been sprayed with pesticides. Furthermore, if pesticides were not used on fruit and vegetables, their cost would rise, and consequently their consumption would go down, which would cause cancer rates to increase. He goes on to criticize the fear of a vertiginous decline in biodiversity, proposing that 0.7% of species have gone extinct in the last 50 years (as compared to a maximum of 50%, as claimed by some biologists). While Lomborg admits that extinctions are a problem, he asserts that they are not the catastrophe claimed by some, and have little effect on human prosperity.

Lomborg's most contentious assertion, however, involves global warming. From the outset, Lomborg "accepts the reality of man-made global warming" though he expresses his uncertainty towards the computer simulations of climate change and some aspects of data collection. His contention is the politics and the policy response to scientific findings. Lomborg points out that, given the amount of greenhouse gas reduction required to combat global warming, the current Kyoto Protocol is grossly insufficient. He argues that the economic costs of legislative restrictions that aim to slow or reverse global warming are far higher than the alternative of international coordination. Moreover, he asserts that the cost of combating global warming would be disproportionately shouldered by  developing countries. Lomborg proposes that since the Kyoto agreement limits economic activities, developing countries that suffer from pollution and poverty most, will be perpetually handicapped economically.

Lomborg proposes that the importance of global warming in terms of policy priority is low compared to other policy issues such as fighting poverty, disease and aiding poor countries, which has direct and more immediate impact both in terms of welfare and the environment. He therefore suggests that a global cost-benefit analysis be undertaken before deciding on future measures.

Conclusions
Lomborg concludes his book by once again reviewing his Litany, and states his belief that the real state of the world is much better than his Litany claims. According to Lomborg, this discrepancy poses a problem, as it focuses public attention on relatively unimportant issues, while ignoring those that are paramount. In the worst case, The Skeptical Environmentalist argues, the global community is pressured to adopt inappropriate policies which have adverse effects on humanity, wasting resources that could be put to better use in aiding poor countries or fighting diseases such as AIDS. Lomborg thus urges to look at what he calls the true problems of the world, since solving those will also solve his Litany.

Reception and controversy upon release

 Danish edition 
The Danish Ecological Council, an independent advisory committee on environmental issues, felt the need to prepare a "counter-publication" to the Danish edition of the book, which was released in 1999 as Fremtidens Pris (The Price of the Future). It featured 18 contributors from various disciplines, which criticised Lomborg's methods and approach.

Scientific community

The scientific and environmental community were generally very critical of the book, in some cases harsh in both content and tone. Criticisms covered a wide variety of topics, including Lomborg's methodology, data issues and theories and concepts. The most common criticism were selective use of data, followed by issues with referencing, choosing arguments not representative of the environmental movement and addressing regional rather than global trends.

The Union of Concerned Scientists published a critique of the book, highlighting reviews by Peter Gleick, Jerry Mahlman, Thomas Lovejoy, Norman Myers, Jeffrey Harvey, E. O. Wilson and Stuart Pimm. The UCS concluded that "The Skeptical Environmentalist fits squarely in a tradition of contrarian works on the environment that may gain temporary prominence but ultimately fail to stand up to scientific scrutiny." Harvey said that the book "has an undergraduate quality to it, but is this surprising considering that ecology is the most complex of sciences and that Lomborg has never done a shred of work in the field?” and “I would fail one of my undergraduate students if they were to write such trash". In a letter to Lomborg, Wilson said that "the greatest regret I have about it all is the time wasted by scientists correcting the misinformation you created.”

The January 2002 issue of Scientific American contained, under the heading "Misleading Math about the Earth", a set of essays by several scientists, which maintain that Lomborg and The Skeptical Environmentalist misrepresent both scientific evidence and scientific opinion. The magazine then refused Lomborg's request to print a lengthy point-by-point rebuttal in his own defence, on the grounds that the 32 pages would have taken a disproportionate share of the month's instalment. Scientific American allowed Lomborg a one-page defense in the May 2002 edition, and then attempted to remove Lomborg's publication of his complete response online, citing a copyright violation. The magazine later published his complete rebuttal on its website, along with the counter rebuttals of John Rennie and John P. Holdren.Nature also published a harsh review of Lomborg's book, in which Stuart Pimm of the Center for Environmental Research and Conservation at Columbia University and Jeff Harvey of the Netherlands Institute of Ecology wrote: "Like bad term papers, Lomborg's text relies heavily on secondary sources. Out of around 2,000 references, about 5% come from news sources and 30% from web downloads — readily accessible, therefore, but frequently not peer reviewed." They continued that "the text employs the strategy of those who, for example, argue that gay men aren't dying of AIDS, that Jews weren't singled out by the Nazis for extermination, and so on."

Peter Gleick was also highly critical, stating "there is nothing original or unique in Lomborg's book. Many of his criticisms have appeared in... previous works—and even in the work of environmental scientists themselves. What is new, perhaps, is the scope and variety of the errors he makes." David Pimentel wrote a critical review in Population and Environment, particularly taking issue with Lomborg's argument on soil erosion, pesticides, deforestation and water resources. He concluded that "as an agricultural scientist and ecologist, I wish I could share Lomborg’s optimistic views, but my investigations and that of countless scientists leads me to a more conservative outlook." Roger A. Pielke, meanwhile, defended Lomborg and the book, describing the debate as an example of politicising science.

The December 12, 2001 issue of Grist devoted an issue to The Skeptical Environmentalist, with a series of essays from various scientists challenging individual sections. A separate article examining the book's overall approach took issue with the framing of Lomborg's conclusions:

Lomborg begins by making the entirely reasonable point that accurate information is critical to informed decision-making. If information is skewed to paint a bleaker environmental picture than is justified by reality, as he claims, then we will in turn skew our limited resources in favor of the environment and away from other important causes. ... Then Lomborg proceeds to weigh the causes championed by the environmental movement against a deliberately circumscribed universe of other possible "good causes." It is up to us, he says, to make responsible decisions about whether to protect the environment or "boost Medicaid, increase funding to the arts, or cut taxes. ... The worse they can make this state appear, the easier it is for them to convince us we need to spend more money on the environment rather on hospitals, kindergartens, etc." A few pages later he again claims that the purpose of the Litany is to cause us to prioritize the environment over "hospitals, child day care, etc." ... But who is really failing to consider how our money is spent? As Lomborg notes, "We will never have enough money," and therefore, "Prioritization is absolutely essential." Why, then, does he weigh the environment only against hospitals and childcare, rather than against, say, industry subsidies and defense spending?

Media coverage
Influential UK newsweekly The Economist supported Lomborg's views, publishing an advance essay by Lomborg in which he detailed his "litany", and following up with a highly favorable review and supportive coverage. It stated that "This is one of the most valuable books on public policy—not merely environmental policy—to have been written for the intelligent general reader in the past ten years...The Skeptical Environmentalist is a triumph."

Chris Lavers gave a mixed review in The Guardian, saying Lomborg "is clearly committed to rubbishing the views of hand-picked environmentalists, frequently the very silly ones such as Ehrlich, whom professionals have been ignoring for decades" and criticising his framing of deforestation.

In a BBC column from August 23, 2001, veteran BBC environmental correspondent Alex Kirby wrote:
I am neither a statistician nor a scientist, and I lack the skill to judge Lomborg's reworkings of the statistics of conventional wisdom. But I am worried that on virtually every topic he touches, he reaches conclusions radically different from almost everybody else. That seems to suggest that most scientists are wrong, short-sighted, naïve, interested only in securing research funds, or deliberately dancing to the campaigners' tune. Most I know are honest, intelligent and competent. So it beggars belief to suppose that Professor Lomborg is the only one in step, every single time.

Kirby's first concern was not with the extensive research and statistical analysis, but the conclusions drawn from them:

What really riles me about his book is that it is so damnably reasonable. In the rational world that Bjørn Lomborg thinks we all inhabit, we would manage problems sensibly, one by one. But the real world is messier, more unpredictable—and more impatient.
Legal scholar David Shoenbrod was one of the defenders of Lomborg. In March 2003, the New York Law School Law Review published an examination of the critical reviews of Skeptical Environmentalist from the Scientific American, Nature and Science magazines by Shoenbrod and then-Senior Law Student Christi Wilson of New York Law School. The authors defend Lomborg, say that the book is "largely free from factual errors", and characterise the scientific community's response to the book as a "disingenuous attack", using legal arguments that a court should accept Lomborg as a credible expert witness in the field of statistics, given that his testimony would be appropriately restricted to his area of expertise.

 Reception of media coverage 
One critical article, "The Skeptical Environmentalist: A Case Study in the Manufacture of News", attributes the book's media success to its initial, influential supporters:

News of the pending book first appeared in the UK in early June of 2001 when a Sunday Times article by Nayab Chohan featured an advanced report of claims made by Lomborg that London's air was cleaner than at any time since 1585.  Headlined "Cleanest London Air for 400 Years," the publicity hook was both local and timely, as the tail end of the article linked the book's questioning of the Kyoto climate change protocol to U.S. president George W. Bush's visit the same week to Europe, and Bush's controversial opposition to the treaty. The Times followed up the report the next day with a news article further detailing the book's Kyoto protocol angle. With The Times reports, Lomborg and his claims had made the Anglo media agenda. As is typically the case, other media outlets followed the reporting of the elite newspaper. Articles pegging the claims of The Skeptical Environmentalist to Bush's European visit ran later that week in the U.K's The Express and Daily Telegraph, and Canada's Toronto Star.

The media was criticized for the biased selection of reviewers and not informing readers of reviewers' background. Richard C. Bell, writing for Worldwatch, noted that the Wall Street Journal, "instead of seeking scientists with a critical perspective," like many publications "put out reviews by people who were closely associated with Lomborg", with the Journal soliciting a review from the Competitive Enterprise Institute's Ronald Bailey, someone "who had earlier written a book called The True State of the World, from which much of Lomborg's claims were taken." Bell also criticized the Washington Post, whose Sunday Book World assigned the book review to Denis Dutton, identified as "a professor of philosophy who lectures on the dangers of pseudoscience at the science faculties of the University of Canterbury in New Zealand", and as the editor of the web site Arts and Letters Daily. Bell noted that:

The Post did not tell its readers that Dutton's web site features links to the Global Climate Coalition, an anti-Kyoto consortium of oil and coal businesses, and to the messages of Julian Simon—the man whose denial that global warming was occurring apparently gave Lomborg the idea for his book in the first place. It was hardly surprising that Dutton anointed Lomborg's book as "the most significant work on the environment since the appearance of its polar opposite, Rachel Carson's Silent Spring, in 1962. It's a magnificent achievement."

 Pieing incident 

On September 5, 2001, at a Lomborg book reading in England, British environmentalist author Mark Lynas threw a cream pie in Lomborg's face. In a September 9, 2001, article, "Why I pied Lomborg", Lynas stated "Lomborg specialises in presenting the reader with false choices—such as the assertion that money not spent on preventing climate change could be spent on bringing clean water to the developing world, thereby saving more lives per dollar of expenditure. Of course, in the real world, these are not the kind of choices we are faced with." Addressing the apparent difficulty of scientists opposing The Skeptical Environmentalist in criticizing the book strictly on the basis of statistics and challenging the conclusions about areas of environmental sciences that were drawn from them, Lynas contends "one of the biggest problems facing the environmental community in analyzing Lomborg’s book is that his work, as flawed as it is, has clearly been very time-consuming and meticulous. In a busy and under funded world, few people have the time or background knowledge to plow though 3,000 footnotes checking his sources. It is impressively interdisciplinary."

Accusations of scientific dishonesty
After the publication of The Skeptical Environmentalist, Lomborg was accused of scientific dishonesty. Several environmental scientists brought a total of three complaints against Lomborg to the Danish Committees on Scientific Dishonesty (DCSD), a body under Denmark's Ministry of Science, Technology and Innovation. Lomborg was asked whether he regarded the book as a "debate" publication, and thereby not under the purview of the DCSD, or as a scientific work; he chose the latter, clearing the way for the inquiry that followed. The charges claimed that The Skeptical Environmentalist contained deliberately misleading data and flawed conclusions. Due to the similarity of the complaints, the DCSD decided to proceed on the three cases under one investigation.

DCSD investigation
On January 6, 2003, a mixed DCSD ruling was released, in which the Committees decided that The Skeptical Environmentalist was scientifically dishonest, but Lomborg was innocent of wrongdoing due to a lack of expertise in the relevant fields:

Objectively speaking, the publication of the work under consideration is deemed to fall within the concept of scientific dishonesty. ... In view of the subjective requirements made in terms of intent or gross negligence, however, Lomborg's publication cannot fall within the bounds of this characterization. Conversely, the publication is deemed clearly contrary to the standards of good scientific practice.

The DCSD cited The Skeptical Environmentalist for:

Fabrication of data;
Selective discarding of unwanted results (selective citation);
Deliberately misleading use of statistical methods;
Distorted interpretation of conclusions;
Plagiarism;
Deliberate misinterpretation of others' results.

MSTI review and response
On February 13, 2003, Lomborg filed a complaint against the DCSD's decision with the Ministry of Science, Technology and Innovation (MSTI), which oversees the group. On December 17, 2003, the Ministry said that the DCSD had made a number of procedural errors, including:
 Not using a precise standard for deciding "good scientific practice" in the social sciences;
 Defining "objective scientific dishonesty" in a way unclear in determining whether "distortion of statistical data" had to be deliberate or not;
 Not properly documenting that The Skeptical Environmentalist was a scientific publication on which they had the right to intervene in the first place;
 Not providing specific statements on actual errors.

The Ministry remitted the case to the DCSD. In doing so the Ministry indicated that it regarded the DCSD's previous findings of scientific dishonesty in regard to the book as invalid. The Ministry also instructed the DCSD to decide whether to reinvestigate. On March 12, 2004, the Committee formally decided not to act further on the complaints, reasoning that renewed scrutiny would, in all likelihood, result in the same conclusion.

The original DCSD decision about Lomborg provoked a petition among Danish academics from 308 scientists, many from the social sciences, who criticised the DCSD's investigative methods.

Another group of Danish scientists collected signatures in support of the DCSD. The 640 signatures in this second petition came almost exclusively from the medical and natural sciences, and included Nobel laureate in Chemistry Jens Christian Skou, former university rector Kjeld Møllgård, and professor Poul Harremoës from the Technical University of Denmark.

Legacy and later assessments
A group of non-climatologist scientists published an article in 2005 in the Journal of Information Ethics, in which they claimed that most criticism against Lomborg was unjustified, and that the scientific community had misused their authority to suppress the author. The claim that the accusations against Lomborg were unjustified was challenged in the next issue (September 2005) of Journal of Information Ethics by Kåre Fog, one of the original DSDS petitioners. Fog reasserted his contention that, despite the ministry's decision, most of the accusations against Lomborg were valid. He also rejected what he called "the Galileo hypothesis", which he describes as the conception that Lomborg is a brave young man confronting old-fashioned opposition. Fog and other scientists have continued to criticize Lomborg for what one called "a history of misrepresenting" climate science.

A 2010 article in the Journal of Integrative Environmental Sciences recounted the controversy surrounding the book and Lomborg's responses to scientific critics. It examines critical and positive arguments made in reviews of the book. The authors were highly critical Lomborg, as well as Cambridge University Press for publishing the book, concluding "The question remains why a book that contains so many flaws by someone without any scientific credentials has received so much public attention." The authors also scrutinised Lomborg's responses to critics, finding them to have misrepresented, selectively responded to or otherwise failed to address their key points. The authors also concluded the book contradicted principles of environmental economics.

 Legacy and later work The Skeptical Environmentalist established Lomborg internationally as a prominent critic of the scientific consensus on climate change. He was named one of the Time's 100 most influential people in 2004, and established the Copenhagen Consensus to institutionalise his views. Despite the scientific controversy, Lomborg remained respected by conservatives and financial press outlets, and was later appointed director of Denmark's Environmental Assessment Institute.

He released a follow up book Cool It: The Skeptical Environmentalist's Guide to Global Warming in 2007, which was adapted into a film of the same name.

See also
 Global warming controversy
 Media coverage of climate change
Environmental skepticism
 State of FearHubbert peakThe Population BombClimate change denial
Howard Friel, critic of Lomborg

Further reading

 Ed Regis (1997), The Doomslayer (archived 2009-12-16) (Julian Simon article in Wired magazine), Wired

References

Bibliography
Lomborg, Bjørn (2001). The Skeptical Environmentalist: Measuring the Real State of the World. Cambridge, UK: Cambridge University Press. .
van den Bergh, Jeroen (2010). An assessment of Lomborg's The Skeptical Environmentalist and the ensuing debate, Journal of Integrative Environmental Sciences 7(1).

External links
A sample of the book (PDF)
Lomborg's responses to his critics at Bjørn Lomborg's Website
HAN selection of complaints made by Lomborg critics, an article collection by Heidelberg Appeal Nederland, supporting Lomborg.
Kyoto Economics by William Shepherd
New York Law School Law Professor and a Senior Law Student review of the reviews to determine whether Lomborg is still credible as an expert witness and whether his testimony is appropriate to his expertise based on the criticisms of Scientific American, Nature and Science.
The Lomborg Deception: Setting the Record Straight About Global Warming by Howard Friel (Yale University Press, 2010)

Reviews of the book
John Gillot: "The Skeptical Environmentalist" Spiked-Science Online, September 10, 2001.
"Doomsday postponed" The Economist, September 6, 2001.
"Greener Than You Think" , by Denis Dutton in The Washington Post, October 21, 2001.
Review of The Skeptical Environmentalist by the Union of Concerned Scientists with reviews from Peter Gleick, Jerry D. Mahlman and E.O. Wilson.
"Nine things journalists should know about The Skeptical Environmentalist", World Resources Institute.
"The Skeptical Environmentalist: A Case Study in the Manufacture of News", Committee for the Scientific Investigation of Claims of the Paranormal, January 23, 2003.
"Something Is Rotten in the State of Denmark" , Grist Magazine, December 12, 2001.
Misleading Math about the Earth: Science defends itself against The Skeptical Environmentalist Scientific American January 2002
Chris Lavers: "You've never had it so good", The Guardian'' September 1, 2001.

2001 non-fiction books
2001 in the environment
Cambridge University Press books
Climate change denial
Danish non-fiction books
Demography books
Environmental non-fiction books
Environmentally skeptical books
Futurology books
Literature controversies
Environmental controversies
2001 controversies
2003 controversies
Scientific controversies